Alberto Grassi (born 7 March 1995) is an Italian professional footballer who plays as a midfielder for  club Empoli, on loan from Parma.

Club career

Atalanta
Born in Brescia, Grassi began his career in Atalanta's youth setup. On 29 May 2012 he signed his first professional deal, after being promoted to the club's Primavera squad.

Grassi was definitely assigned to the main squad in August 2014, after impressing manager Stefano Colantuono in the pre-season. He played his first match as a professional on 22 November, replacing fellow youth graduate Daniele Baselli in the 69th minute of a 2–1 Serie A home loss against Roma.

On 2 October 2015, Grassi renewed his contract until 2020.

Napoli
On 27 January 2016, Grassi joined Napoli for a fee of €10 million.

Atalanta
On 30 August 2016, Grassi was loaned back to Atalanta.

Parma
After initially joining Parma on loan for the 2018–19 season, he returned to the club on a new loan for 2019–20 season with an obligation to buy at the end of the season.

Loan to Cagliari
On 21 August 2021, he was loaned to Cagliari, with an option to buy. If certain conditions were met, the option would have become an obligation to buy.

Loan to Empoli
On 17 August 2022, Grassi joined Empoli on loan with an option to buy and a conditional obligation to buy.

International career 
On 12 August 2015, he made his debut with the Italy U21 team, in a friendly match against Hungary.

In June 2017, he was included in the Italy under-21 squad for the 2017 UEFA European Under-21 Championship by manager Luigi Di Biagio. Italy were eliminated in the semi-finals following a 3–1 defeat to Spain on 27 June.

Career statistics

Club

References

External links

Atalanta official profile 
FIGC international stats 

1995 births
Living people
Footballers from Brescia
Italian footballers
Association football midfielders
Serie A players
Atalanta B.C. players
S.P.A.L. players
Parma Calcio 1913 players
Cagliari Calcio players
Empoli F.C. players
Italy youth international footballers
Italy under-21 international footballers